Walko is a surname. Notable people with the surname include:

Don Walko (born 1953), American politician
Lajos Walko (1880–1954), Hungarian politician